Loving You Is My Sin (Italian: Amarti è il mio peccato (Suor Celeste)) is a 1953 Italian melodrama film directed by Sergio Grieco and starring Jacques Sernas,  Luisa Rossi and Elisa Cegani.

Cast
 Jacques Sernas as Count Giorgio Danieli
 Luisa Rossi as Elena Galassi Monti
 Elisa Cegani as Countess Danieli - Giorgio's mother
 Alba Arnova as Valeria Ferri - Elena's friend
 Jole Fierro as Sister Luisa
 Patrizia Lari as Countess Laura Danieli - Giorgio's sister
 Pina Piovani as The Mother Superior
 Carlo Tamberlani as Monti - Elena's father
 Giulio Battiferri as Tanzi - the police commissioner
 Gino Bramieri as Guidi - Valeria's wooer
 Víctor Ferrari
 Giuseppe Taffarel as Mario Natali - the blind captain
 Sandro Pistolini as Giorgio Monti - Elena's son

References

Bibliography
 Emiliano Morreale. Così piangevano: il cinema melò nell'Italia degli anni Cinquanta. Donzelli Editore, 2011.

External links

1953 films
1950s Italian-language films
Films directed by Sergio Grieco
1953 drama films
French drama films
Italian drama films
Melodrama films
Italian black-and-white films
French black-and-white films
1950s Italian films
1950s French films